The 2021 Rhode Island Rams baseball team represented the University of Rhode Island during the 2021 NCAA Division I baseball season. The Rams played their home games at Bill Beck Field as a member of the Atlantic 10 Conference They were led by head coach Raphael Cerrato, in his seventh year as head coach.

The Rams won the Northern Division championship, obtaining a record of 28–26–1 (13–6) before losing in the semifinal round of the 2021 Atlantic 10 Conference baseball tournament. They did not earn a bid into the NCAA tournament.

Previous season

The 2020 Rhode Island Rams baseball team notched a 8–5 (0–0) regular-season record. The season prematurely ended on March 12, 2020, due to concerns over the COVID-19 pandemic.

Game log

Awards and honors

References

External links 
 URI Baseball

Rhode Island Rams baseball seasons
Rhode Island Rams
Rhode Island Rams